Bela atlantidea is a species of sea snail, a marine gastropod mollusk in the family Mangeliidae.

Distribution
This species occurs in the Mediterranean Sea off Spain and in tropical West African waters.

References

 Smriglio, Carlo, et al. "Brachycythara atlantidea (Knudsen, 1952)(Gastropoda, Neogastropoda." (2007)
  Mariottini P., Smriglio C., Calascibetta A. & di Giulio A. (2012) Taxonomic remarks on Bela atlantidea (Mollusca: Gastropoda: Mangeliidae) and updated distribution in the Mediterranean basin. Marine Biodiversity Records 5: e120
 Rolàn, E. & Otero-Schmitt J., 1999. - The family Turridae s. l. (Mollusca, Neogastropoda) in Angola, 2. subfamily Mangeliinae Fischer, 1883. Argonauta 13(1): 5–26
 P. Bouchet and M. Taviani (1992) The Mediterranean deep-sea fauna: pseudopopulations of Atlantic species? Deep-Sea Research 39, 169–184.

External links
 Biolib.cz: Image of a shell of Bela atlantidea
 Mediterranean records of Bela atlantidea (Knudsen, 1952) 
 Paratype at MNHN, Paris

atlantidea